is a very small asteroid, classified as a near-Earth object of the Apollo group, approximately 5 to 16 meters in diameter. It was first observed by astronomers of the Mount Lemmon Survey at Mount Lemmon Observatory, Arizona, on 8 February 2018, one day prior its close encounter with Earth at 0.18 lunar distances.

Orbit and classification 

 is a member of the Apollo asteroids, which cross the orbit of Earth. Apollo's are the largest group of near-Earth objects with nearly 10 thousand known objects.

Based on a high orbital uncertainty, this asteroid orbits the Sun at a distance of 0.63–1.77 AU once every 16 months (482 days; semi-major axis of 1.20 AU). Its orbit has an eccentricity of 0.47 and an inclination of 26° with respect to the ecliptic. With an aphelion of 1.77 AU, it is also a Mars-crosser, as it crosses the orbit of the Red Planet at 1.666 AU. The body's observation arc begins at Mount Lemmon with its first observation on 8 February 2018.

Close encounters 

2018 flyby 

On 9 February 2018,  passed at a nominal distance of only  from Earth at 7:25 UTC. This corresponds to 0.18 LD. Based on the body's high orbital uncertainty, all subsequent close encounters in 2022, 2023, 2026, 2027 and 2031, are projected to occur at a distance of more than 15 million kilometers (0.1 AU; 39 LD).

Physical characteristics 

The Minor Planet Center estimates a diameter of 5–16 meters. Based on a generic magnitude-to-diameter conversion,  measures between 9 and 17 meters in diameter, for an absolute magnitude of 27.653, and an assumed albedo between 0.057 and 0.20, which represent typical values for carbonaceous and stony asteroids, respectively.

As of 2018, no rotational lightcurve of  has been obtained from photometric observations. The body's rotation period, pole and shape remain unknown.

Numbering and naming 

This minor planet has neither been numbered nor named.

See also
 List of asteroid close approaches to Earth in 2018

References

External links 

 MPEC MPEC 2018-C76 : 2018 CN2, Minor Planet Electronic Circular, 10 February 2018
 Asteroid 2018 CN2 close approach, International Asteroid Warning Network (IWAN)
 Asteroid 2018 CN2 flew past Earth at 0.18 LD, discovered one day before closest approach, The Watchers, 11 February 2018
 
 

Minor planet object articles (unnumbered)
Discoveries by MLS
Near-Earth objects in 2018
20180208